The men's long jump event of the athletics events at the 2011 Pan American Games was held  between the 24 and 25 of October at the Telmex Athletics Stadium. The defending Pan American Games champion is Irving Saladino of the Panama.

On November 9, 2011 the winner Victor Castillo of Venezuela was disqualified after testing positive for methylhexaneamine.

Records
Prior to this competition, the existing world and Pan American Games records were as follows:

Qualification
Each National Olympic Committee (NOC) was able to enter up to two entrants providing they had met the minimum standard (7.65) in the qualifying period (January 1, 2010 to September 14, 2011).

Schedule

Results
All distances shown are in meters:centimeters

Qualification
Qualification was held on October 24. Qualifying Performance 7.80 (Q) or at least 12 best performers (q) advance to the final.

Final
The final was held on October 25.

References

Athletics at the 2011 Pan American Games
2011